Iván Díaz Ruiz (born 10 July 1978) is a Spanish former footballer who played as a midfielder.

Club career
Born in Sabadell, Barcelona, Catalonia, Díaz was a FC Barcelona youth graduate. He made his senior debut with CE Sabadell FC on 21 May 1995, coming on as a substitute in a 2–0 Segunda División B away loss against Benidorm CF at the age of 16 years and 10 months.

Bought by RCD Espanyol in 1998 for 15 million pesetas, Díaz was initially assigned to the reserves also in the third tier. Promoted to the main squad the following year, he made his professional debut on 17 July 1999 when he started the 0–2 home defeat to Montpellier HSC for that year's UEFA Intertoto Cup.

Díaz made his La Liga debut on 22 April 2000, starting in a 1–0 loss at Real Valladolid. In the summer of 2002 he moved to Albacete Balompié of Segunda División (initially on loan, later permanently), achieving promotion at the first attempt; he scored his first professional goal in the meantime, the winner in a 2–1 home win over UD Las Palmas.

Díaz left Alba in 2005 after suffering relegation, and subsequently resumed his career in the lower leagues, representing Sabadell, UE Figueres, UD Logroñés, CF Atlético Ciudad, Espanyol B, Terrassa FC, Sangonera Atlético CF, CD Leganés (two stints), CE Premià, FC Santboià, Palamós CF, CD Alcanar and Ripoll CF. He also had international stints at Halmstads BK and Auckland City FC.

References

External links

 

1978 births
Living people
Sportspeople from Sabadell
Spanish footballers
Footballers from Catalonia
Association football midfielders
La Liga players
Segunda División players
Segunda División B players
Tercera División players
Divisiones Regionales de Fútbol players
CE Sabadell FC footballers
RCD Espanyol B footballers
RCD Espanyol footballers
Albacete Balompié players
UE Figueres footballers
UD Logroñés players
CF Atlético Ciudad players
Terrassa FC footballers
CD Leganés players
CE Premià players
FC Santboià players
Palamós CF footballers
Allsvenskan players
Halmstads BK players
New Zealand Football Championship players
Auckland City FC players
Spanish expatriate footballers
Expatriate footballers in Sweden
Expatriate association footballers in New Zealand
Spanish expatriate sportspeople in Sweden
Spanish expatriate sportspeople in New Zealand